"Mud on the Tires" is a song co-written and recorded by American country music singer Brad Paisley.  It was released in September 2004 as the fourth and final single and title track off Paisley's album Mud on the Tires.  The song reached number-one on the U.S. Billboard Hot Country Songs chart and peaked at number 30 on the U.S. Billboard Hot 100 chart. It was written by Paisley and Chris DuBois.

Content
In the song, the narrator sings about finally getting a loan and buying a new Chevrolet pickup truck. He suggests to his significant other that they go out into the woods and hang out, breaking the truck in and getting some "mud on the tires." Chevrolet sponsored the product placement in the song. The album cover features a 2003 Chevrolet Silverado.

Music video
The music video features Brad performing the song live at an event called Mudstock while people party and watch from a very muddy terrain. Also during the video, two women argue about whether Brad “plays great” or “looks better” and end up fighting in the mud, parodying Miller Lite's "Great Taste, Less Filling" advertising campaign of the time, as Brad and the late Little Jimmy Dickens watch the commercial and admit they "will buy whatever the commercial is selling."

Chart performance
The song debuted at number 54 on the U.S. Billboard Hot Country Singles & Tracks for the week ending September 11, 2004.

Year-end charts

Certifications

References

2004 singles
Brad Paisley songs
Songs written by Brad Paisley
Songs written by Chris DuBois
Song recordings produced by Frank Rogers (record producer)
Arista Nashville singles
2003 songs
Songs about cars